Giannis Tsakirakis (born 1 April 1992) is a football player.

References

External links

1992 births
Living people
Greek footballers
Association football defenders
Doxa Vyronas F.C. players